Arroyo Hondo is an unincorporated community and census-designated place (CDP) in Santa Fe County, New Mexico, United States. It was first listed as a CDP prior to the 2020 census.

The CDP is north of the geographic center of the county and is bordered to the north by Conejo, to the east and south by Sunlit Hills, and to the southeast by Seton Village.

The CDP Arroyo Hondo region is drained by the intermittent stream Arroyo Hondo, which has confluence with Cienega Creek near La Cienega.

Demographics

References 

Census-designated places in Santa Fe County, New Mexico
Census-designated places in New Mexico